Arthuret is a civil parish in the Carlisle district of Cumbria, England.  It contains 25 listed buildings that are recorded in the National Heritage List for England.  Of these, five are listed at Grade II*, the middle of the three grades, and the others are at Grade II, the lowest grade.  The parish includes the small town of Longtown and is otherwise mainly rural.  Two buildings originated as fortified towers, Netherby Hall, which has been expanded converted into a country house, and Brackenhill Tower, which is part of a farm.  These, and structures associated with them, are listed.  Some of the listed buildings are in Longtown, including houses, hotels, a bridge, and a church.  Outside these areas the listed buildings include another church with associated structures, including a holy well, and milestones.


Key

Buildings

References

Citations

Sources

Lists of listed buildings in Cumbria